It's a Great Day is a 1955 British comedy film directed by John Warrington. A spin-off of the popular soap The Grove Family, the film stars Ruth Dunning as Gladys Grove, Edward Evans as Bob Grove, and Sid James as Harry Mason. Nancy Roberts, (1885-1962), as Gran, played the same rôle in the TV series.

Plot summary
A local builder, Bob Grove, has some temperamental differences with his Council Manager leaving him without a product to finish a housing estate. His son, Jack, recruits the services of an alternative supplier, of dubious character, to help him get hold of the materials required to finish work on the new houses. Things turn sour when Bob and his son, Jack, are suspected of stealing, leading to a situation which involves a police investigation. All this takes place around a planned Royal Visit, to the new housing estate.

Cast
 Ruth Dunning as Gladys Grove
 Edward Evans as Bob Grove
 Sid James as Harry Mason
 Vera Day as Blondie
 Sheila Sweet as Pat Grove
 Peter Bryant as Jack Grove
 Nancy Roberts as Gran
 Margaret Downs as Daphne Grove
 Christopher Beeny as Lennie Grove
 Victor Maddern as Charlie Mead
 John Stuart as Detective Inspector Marker
 Henry Oscar as Surveyor
 Marjorie Rhodes as Landlady
 Nan Braunton as Miss Jones

Critical reception
In discussing the original TV show, the Radio Times praised "The excellent Ruth Dunning and Edward Evans," but "the acting honours, and the popularity stakes, were hijacked by formidable Nancy Roberts as Gran. This cheaply made feature version of the show, produced quickly and efficiently by Butcher's Films with the original cast, now looks like a perfect period artefact. The plot is wonderfully naive, casting doubt on upright Mr Grove's integrity, and the cast is studded with marvellous 1950s faces such as Sid James, Victor Maddern, Michael Balfour and Vera Day. It's a treat for nostalgists and those who cherish that period of postwar austerity, when such a cosy family unit was perceived as the ideal."

References

External links

1955 films
1955 comedy films
British comedy films
1950s English-language films
1950s British films
British black-and-white films